is an Echizen Railway Katsuyama Eiheiji Line railway station located in the city of Katsuyama, Fukui Prefecture, Japan.

Lines

Station layout
The station consists of two opposed ground-level side platforms connected by a level crossing. The station is unattended.

Adjacent stations

History
Hossaka Station was opened on March 11, 1914. Operations were halted from June 25, 2001. The station reopened on October 19, 2003 as an Echizen Railway station.

Passenger statistics
In fiscal 2016, the station was used by an average of 58 passengers daily (boarding passengers only).

Surrounding area
The surrounding area is mostly residential with some shops and is more dense than either neighboring station.
A bridge over the Kuzuryū River lies to the north.
Fukui Prefectural Routes 168 and 31 intersect east of the station.

See also
 List of railway stations in Japan

References

External links

  

Railway stations in Fukui Prefecture
Railway stations in Japan opened in 1914
Katsuyama Eiheiji Line
Katsuyama, Fukui